Avi Ivgi (born 2 October 1978) is an Israeli professional football goalkeeper who plays for Liga Alef club Hapoel Qalansawe
. He previously played for Bnei Yehuda Tel Aviv, Hapoel Kfar Saba, Beitar Jerusalem, Hapoel Rishon LeZion, Maccabi Petah Tikva, Hapoel Petah Tikva and Hapoel Nazareth Illit.

Ivgi came through the Hapoel Nazareth Illit youth squad. He made his debut for the club's senior team in the 1996–97 season against Hapoel Majd al-Krum. In 2001 Ivgi moved to Bnei Yehuda and helped them gain promotion to the Israeli Premier League in the 2001–02 season. In 2003, he joined Hapoel Kfar Saba, then in the Liga Leumit. They finished in fourth place in his first season, and in his second, 2004–05, they won the Liga Leumit championship and promotion to the Israeli Premier League. After one season in the top flight with Hapoel Kfar Saba, Ivgi went on to spend a year each with Beitar Jerusalem, Hapoel Rishon LeZion and Maccabi Petah Tikva, before returning to Hapoel Nazareth Illit for 2009-10. He moved on to Maccabi Herzliya in 2010 until 2013. In 2013, he moved to Hapoel Petah Tikva.

Honours
Liga Alef
Runner-up (1): 1998-99
Liga Leumit
Winner (1): 2004–05
Runner-up (1): 2001-02, 2013–14
Israeli Premier League
Winner (1): 2006-07

References

1978 births
Israeli Jews
Living people
Israeli footballers
Footballers from Nof HaGalil
Hapoel Nof HaGalil F.C. players
Bnei Yehuda Tel Aviv F.C. players
Hapoel Kfar Saba F.C. players
Beitar Jerusalem F.C. players
Hapoel Rishon LeZion F.C. players
Maccabi Petah Tikva F.C. players
Maccabi Herzliya F.C. players
Hapoel Petah Tikva F.C. players
Hapoel Marmorek F.C. players
Hapoel Qalansawe F.C. players
Beitar Ramat Gan F.C. players
Beitar Tel Aviv Bat Yam F.C. players
Liga Leumit players
Israeli Premier League players
Israeli beach soccer players
Israeli people of Moroccan-Jewish descent
Association football goalkeepers